The Alfa GTV Cup was a mono-make race series offered by Alfa Romeo for a selected customers. Participants could race against each other on a track with the 3.0-litre GTV race car. After a sports car driving lessons, participants were ready to manage ten races in the mono-make race programme.

Overview
As the Alfa Romeo GTV was created to reestablish the sporty character of the marque, Alfa Romeo has created a series of events for their customers and racing enthusiasts with a GTV race car. With a cost of more than five million Italian lira, a participant could spend two weekends on the race track and participate in the mono-make race series. First there was a driving course at the Safe Driving Centre, conducted by Andrea de Adamich at the Varano Circuit, in order to teach racing techniques and safety. A brand new Alfa Romeo GTV race car was prepared for this programme, producing 230 PS, was also used as part of the Italian Supertourismo Championship series.

Participants
The participants of the Alfa GTV Cup race series were chosen by Alfa Romeo. In total 160 of them were chosen as drivers. Sixteen drivers were competing in each of the ten races in the calendar. Participants had to pay a subscription fee which included sports car driving courses with Andrea De Adamich, a CSAI driving license, a fire-proof racing overalls and complete accommodations for the length of the event. Included were also all the expenses of the race cars. Drivers took part in the free trials, qualifications and the actual races.

Cars
Alfa Romeo prepared sixteen cars for the Alfa GTV Cup. All have been adapted by Fiat Auto Racing in Chivasso and all were equal in performance, which is very important for a mono-make race series. The cars were prepared according to the Group N rules for production vehicles with only slight modifications. The new race car was first tested on track at the Varano Circuit.

From the outside the GTV Cup race car was distinguished by the full Zender-provided aero-kit, that was also available for the road car as well. It consisted of the front and rear spoilers and air vents in the front wings. The suspension was lowered to a total of  height. Cars were equipped with Michelin racing tyres.

The engine was based on a production car's 3.0-litre V6 with 24 valves. Increased power output was achieved because of to the engine chip that re-mapped the fuel injection. The exhaust system was no longer obstructed by any lambda sensors or a catalytic converters. The engine oil cooler was repositioned to the middle.

The only additions were the racing steering wheel and OMP racing bucket seat. All the other seats and most of the interior trim was discarded to save approximately 200 kg.

The six-speed gearbox, based on the unit from the road car, received a long ratio upgrade. This came in effect on long circuits like Mugello or Monza where  maximum speed can be achieved.

Specifications
Engine:  60° V6,  of bore and stroke.
Max power:  at 6900 rpm.
Max torque:  at 5300 rpm.
Tyres: Michelin 20/61-16
Dimensions: height 
Weight:

Road car
To commemorate this event, Alfa Romeo created a limited edition GTV Cup.

References

External links
Alfa GTV Cup
Driving sessions at the wheel of Alfa GTV CUP RACING

Alfa Romeo in motorsport